Meristotheca is a widely distributed genus of red algae some of whose species are eaten as edible seaweed.  In particular, the type species, M. papulosa is a popular vegetable in Taiwan and Japan.

References

Red algae genera
Solieriaceae